The Iraqi–Kurdish conflict consists of a series of wars and rebellions by the Kurds against the central authority of Iraq during the 20th century, which began shortly after the defeat of the Ottoman Empire in World War I and lasting until the U.S. invasion of Iraq in 2003. Some put the marking point of the conflict beginning to the attempt by Mahmud Barzanji to establish an independent Kingdom of Kurdistan, while others relate to the conflict as only the post-1961 insurrection by the Barzanis. The conflict lasted until the U.S. invasion of Iraq in 2003, though tensions between the Kurdish autonomy and the central Iraqi government have continued.

The first chapter of the Iraqi–Kurdish dispute followed the end of World War I and the arrival of British forces. Mahmud Barzanji began secession attempts in 1919 and in 1922 proclaimed the short-lived Kingdom of Kurdistan. Though Mahmud's insurrections were defeated, another Kurdish sheikh, Ahmed Barzani, began to actively oppose the central rule of the Mandatory Iraq during the 1920s. The first of the major Barzani revolts took place in 1931, after Barzani, one of the most prominent Kurdish leaders in Northern Iraq, succeeded in defeating a number of other Kurdish tribes. He ultimately failed and took refuge in Turkey. The next serious Kurdish secession attempt was made by Ahmed Barzani's younger brother Mustafa Barzani in 1943, but that revolt failed as well, resulting in the exiling of Mustafa to Iran, where he participated in an attempt to form the Kurdish Republic of Mahabad.

In 1958, Mustafa Barzani and his fighters returned to Iraq from exile, and an attempt was made to negotiate Kurdish autonomy in the north with the new Iraqi administration of Gen. Qasim. The negotiations ultimately failed and the First Iraqi–Kurdish War erupted on 11 September 1961, lasting until 1970 and inflicting 75,000–105,000 casualties. Despite the attempts to resolve the conflict by providing Kurds with a recognized autonomy in north Iraq (Iraqi Kurdistan), the negotiations failed in 1974, resulting in resumed hostilities known as the Second Iraqi–Kurdish War, which resulted in the collapse of the Kurdish militias and the reconquest of northern Iraq by Iraqi government troops. As a result, Mustafa Barzani and most of the KDP leadership fled to Iran, while PUK gained power in the vacuum, leading an insurgency campaign against the central Iraqi government. Since 1976 PUK and KDP relations quickly deteriorated, reaching the climax in April 1978, when PUK troops suffered a major defeat by KDP, which had the support of Iranian and Iraqi air forces. During this period, the Ba'athist authorities took the opportunity to perform large-scale displacement and colonization projects in North Iraq, aiming to shift demographics and thus destabilize Kurdish power bases.

The conflict re-emerged as part of the Iran–Iraq War, with the Kurdish parties collaborating against Saddam Husein and KDP also gaining military support by the Islamic Republic of Iran. By 1986 Iraqi leadership grew tired of the strengthening and non-loyal Kurdish entity in north Iraq and began a genocidal campaign, known as Al-Anfal, to oust the Kurdish fighters and take revenge on the Kurdish population—an act often described as the Kurdish genocide, with an estimated 50,000–200,000 casualties. In the aftermath of the Persian Gulf War, a series of uprisings shattered Iraq, but only the Kurds succeeded in achieving a status of unrecognized autonomy within one of the Iraqi no-fly zones, established by the US-led coalition. In the mid-1990s the conflict between the KDP and PUK erupted once again, resulting in a bloody civil war, which ended in 1997. Despite mutual recognition after the 2003 Iraq war which ousted Ba'ath rule, relations between Iraqi Kurdistan and the Iraqi central government grew strained between 2011 and 2012 due to power-sharing issues and the export of oil.

Early conflicts

Mahmud Barzanji (1919–1924)
Mahmud Barzanji revolts were a series of armed uprisings against the British forces in the newly conquered Mesopotamia and later the British Mandate in Iraq. Following his first insurrection in May 1919, Sheykh Mahmud was imprisoned and eventually exiled to India for a one-year period. When he returned he was once again appointed a governor, but shortly afterwards revolted again and declared himself the ruler of the Kingdom of Kurdistan. The Kingdom of Kurdistan lasted from September 1922 – 1924. With British forces greatly exceeding his in ammunition and training, Barzanji was finally subdued and the region reverted to central British Iraqi rule in 1924. Sheykh Mahmud retreated into the mountains, and eventually reached terms with the independent Kingdom of Iraq in 1932, over his return from the underground. Shaykh Mahmud revolts are considered the first chapter of the modern Iraqi–Kurdish conflict.

1931 Kurdish revolt 
Ahmed Barzani revolt refers to the first of the major Barzani revolts, taking place in 1931 after Ahmed Barzani, one of the most prominent Kurdish leaders in Southern Kurdistan, succeeded in unifying a number of other Kurdish tribes. The Barzan forces were eventually overpowered by the Iraqi Army with British support, forcing the leaders of Barzan to go underground.

Ahmed Barzani was later forced to flee to Turkey, where he was held in detention and then sent to exile in the south of Iraq. Although initially a tribal dispute, the involvement of the Iraqi government inadvertently led to the growth of Shaykh Ahmad and Mulla Mustafa Barzani as prominent Kurdish leaders.

1943 Kurdish revolt 

The 1943–1945 Kurdish revolt in Iraq was a Kurdish nationalistic insurrection in the Kingdom of Iraq, during World War II. The revolt was led by Mustafa Barzani and later joined by his older brother Ahmed Barzani, the leader of the previous Kurdish revolt in the Kingdom of Iraq. The revolt, initiating in 1943, was eventually put down by Iraqi military assault in late 1945, combined with the defection of a number of Kurdish tribes. As a result, the Barzanis retreated with much of their forces into Iranian Kurdistan, joining the local Kurdish elements in establishing the Republic of Mahabad.

Main phase

Negotiations over Kurdish autonomy (1958–1960)
After the military coup by Abdul Karim Qasim in 1958, Mustafa Barzani was invited by new Iraqi President Qasim to return from exile, and was greeted with a "hero's welcome", as a former dissident to the now abolished Iraqi monarchy. As part of the deal arranged between Qasim and Barzani, Qasim promised to give the Kurds regional autonomy in return for Barzani's support for his policies. Meanwhile, during 1959–60, Barzani became the head of the Kurdistan Democratic Party (KDP), which was granted legal status in 1960.

First Iraqi–Kurdish War (1961–1970)

First Iraqi–Kurdish War or Barazani Rebellion was a major event of the Iraqi–Kurdish conflict, lasting from 1961 to 1970. The struggle was led by Mustafa Barzani in an attempt to establish an independent Kurdish state in north Iraq. Throughout the 1960s the uprising escalated into a long war, which failed to resolve despite internal power changes in Iraq. The war ended with a stalemate by 1970, resulting in between 75,000 to 105,000 casualties. A series of Iraqi–Kurdish negotiations followed the war in an attempt to resolve the conflict.

Cease-fire (1970–1974)

A Kurdish Autonomy agreement was reached in March 1970 by the Iraqi government and the Kurds, in the aftermath of the First Iraqi–Kurdish War, for the creation of an Autonomous Region, consisting of the three Kurdish governorates and other adjacent districts that have been determined by census to have a Kurdish majority. The plan also gave Kurds representation in government bodies, to be implemented in four years. For its time it was the most serious attempt to resolve the long-running conflict.

Second Iraqi–Kurdish War (1974–1975)

Second Iraqi–Kurdish War was an offensive, led by Iraqi forces against rebel KDP troops of Mustafa Barzani during 1974–75. The war came in the aftermath of the First Iraqi–Kurdish War (1961–70), as the 1970 peace plan for Kurdish autonomy had failed to be implemented by 1974. Unlike the previous guerilla campaign, waged by Barzani, the 1974 war was an attempt for symmetric warfare against the Iraqi Army, which eventually led to the quick collapse of the Kurds, lacking advanced and heavy weaponry. The war ended with the exile of the Iraqi KDP and between 7,000 and 20,000 deaths on both sides.

Arabization of Iraqi Kurdistan and PUK insurgency (1976–1979)

The PUK insurgency was a low-level militant campaign by the Patriotic Union of Kurdistan (PUK) against the state of Iraq, after the defeat of the Kurdistan Democratic Party (KDP) in the Second Iraqi–Kurdish War, which forced the KDP organization to declare a ceasefire and move into exile. Due to lack of foreign support, however, the guerrillas were only able to operate in the highest regions of Iraqi Kurdistan's mountains. The PUK also faced the KDP, the KDPI, led by Abdul Rahman Ghassemlou, and Iran supporting the Iraqis at various occasions. The insurgency dimmed with the 1979 Kurdish rebellion in Iran.

Ba'athist Arabization campaigns in North Iraq were forced displacement and cultural Arabization of minorities (Kurds, Yezidis, Assyrians, Shabaks, Armenians, Turkmen, Mandeans), in line with settler colonialist policies, led by the Ba'athist government of Iraq from 1960s to early 2000s, in order to shift the demographics of North Iraq towards Arab domination. The Baath party under Saddam Hussein engaged into active expulsion of minorities from the mid-1970s onwards. The campaigns took place during the Iraqi–Kurdish conflict, being largely motivated by the Kurdish-Arab ethnic and political conflict.

The policies are sometimes referred as "internal colonialism", described by Dr. Francis Kofi Abiew as a "Colonial 'Arabization'" program, including large-scale Kurdish deportations and forced Arab settlement in the region.

Kurdish rebellion during the Iran–Iraq War (1980–1988)
Between 1980 and 1988, the conflict intensified as the Iran–Iraq War commenced. One of the groups targeted in particular by Iraqi authorities were the Feyli Kurds, a community of Shi'ite Kurds settled in the southern area of the Zagros Mountains near Iraq's border with Iran. Saddam Hussein considered the group as 'Iranians' and began a campaign to drive the settlers out of the area as a part of his 'Arabization' policy in 1980., Saddam Hussein was severely critical of the Kurdistan Democratic Party (KDP) as they aligned forces with Iran in the conflict. In 1983, to avenge this liaison, he ordered the Army to abduct as many as 8,000 men and boys from Erbil province, where the clan of Barzani Kurds was based. Massoud Barzani, the leader of the clan and the KDP, himself lost 37 members of his family to the Iraqi troops. They were reported to having been sent to Nugra Salman prison in the southern deserts of Iraq, where they were tortured. Subsequently, the remains of 512 Barzani men were discovered in a mass grave. On March 16, 1988, Iraqi troops began shelling the Kurdish town of Halabja, in retaliation for an attack on Iraqi positions carried out by Iranian Revolutionary Guards and the aligned Peshmerga fighters. Subsequently, the town was attacked with a mix of chemical substances such as VX (nerve agent), sarin and mustard gas (see Halabja chemical attack). Over 5,000 people are believed to have been killed in the attack, which was considered to be a part of the Al-Anfal Campaign, directed against Kurds by the government under the command of Ali Hassan al-Majid, head of the Northern Bureau of the Ba'ath Party.

1991 Kurdish uprising

On 2 August 1990, Saddam launched a military invasion onto neighboring Kuwait, reportedly due to its vast oil reserves, which would have helped him pay off the debts he owed to other countries during the Iran–Iraq War (see Gulf War). Within 24 hours, the Emir of Kuwait had fled. However, subsequently, an international coalition force consisting of American, British, Saudi and other troops liberated the country in 1991 and Iraqi troops were forced out of Kuwait (see Operation Desert Storm). Subsequently, one month after the Gulf War in February 1991, United States President George H. W. Bush called on the Iraqi people to stage an uprising against Saddam Hussein. This was followed by a series of rebellions in many parts of the country, such as the south by Shi'ite groups such as SCIRI and the Islamic Da'awa Party. Meanwhile, the Kurds in the north staged their own uprising for autonomy, under the leadership of Massoud Barzani, leader of the Kurdistan Democratic Party, and Jalal Talabani, leader of the Patriotic Union of Kurdistan. The Peshmerga were trained into hardened guerrillas, who managed to infiltrate the Jash, a Saddam-orientated Kurdish militia (see Jash (term) and National Defense Battalions (Iraq)). The rebels soon managed to capture the town of Ranya, Sulaimaniya and ultimately the oil center of Kirkuk. Saddam retaliated swiftly, battering Kirkuk with artillery and targeting hospitals in particular. Geographically the towns captured by the Kurdish rebels were difficult to defend as they sat on plains below mountains. The rebels were forced to retreat in the mountains, where reportedly the Iraqi helicopters threw flour on them (which was believed to be a grim legacy of the reputed powdery chemical weapons which were used by the Iraqi administration during the Al-Anfal Campaign).

Later phase
The "two-state solution" for the conflict refers to the permanent separation of Iraqi Kurdistan from Iraq, as opposed to retaining Iraqi unity with Iraqi Kurdistan as an autonomous region. It would change the long-term status which has existed in the country following the formation of the Kurdish autonomy in Northern Iraq in 1991. Another term that exists is the "three-state solution", the name for a proposal to divide into three states for its three minorities: the Kurds, the Sunni Arabs and the Shias in the south.

Kurdish Civil War (1994–1997)

The Iraqi Kurdish Civil War was a military conflict, which took place between rival Kurdish factions in Iraqi Kurdistan in the mid-1990s, most notably the Patriotic Union of Kurdistan vs. the Kurdistan Democratic Party. Over the course of the conflict, Kurdish factions from Iran and Turkey, as well as Iranian, Iraqi and Turkish forces were drawn into the fighting, with additional involvement from the American forces. Between 3,000 and 5,000 fighters and civilians were killed throughout more than 3 years of warfare.

2003 invasion of Iraq

Arriving in July 2002 to Iraqi Kurdistan, the CIA seldom worked with the peshmerga, despite their claim to be on a counterterrorism mission against Ansar al-Islam. To the disappointment of PUK peshmerga intent on destroying Ansar al-Islam, the true mission of the CIA was to acquire intelligence about the Iraqi government and military. CIA-peshmerga operations eventually went beyond the scope of intelligence gathering however, as PUK peshmerga were used to destroy key rail lines and buildings prior to the U.S. attack in March 2003. Following Turkey's decision to deny any official use of its territory, the Coalition was forced to modify the planned simultaneous attack from north and south. Special Operations forces from the CIA and US Army managed to build and lead the Kurdish Peshmerga into an effective force and assault for the North.

On March 20, 2003, at approximately 02:30 UTC or about 90 minutes after the lapse of the 48-hour deadline, at 05:33 local time, explosions were heard in Baghdad, signaling the beginning of the U.S.-led invasion. Beginning on 21 March 2003, U.S. forces launched Tomahawk missiles at selected Ansar al-Islam positions throughout the Sargat Valley. In preparation for the ground assault, nicknamed Operation Viking Hammer, American Lt. Col. Tovo divided his forces into six mixed peshmerga-Special Forces units. The peshmerga in two of these teams refused to contribute to the assault for various reasons including having lost too many personnel in previous fighting. The peshmerga who did fight were once again armed with AK-47s, rocket-propelled grenades, and other assorted weapons.

Despite their well-armed adversaries, during the operation only 24 peshmerga were killed in the fighting, compared to an enemy body count of over 300.

2011–2012 tensions

Tensions between Iraqi Kurdistan and the central Iraqi government mounted through 2011–2012 on the issues of power sharing, oil production and territorial control. In April 2012, the president of Iraq's semi-autonomous northern Kurdish region demanded that officials agree to their demands or face consequences of a secession from Baghdad by September 2012.

In September 2012, Iraqi government ordered the Kurdistan Regional Government (KRG) to transfer its powers over Peshmerga to the central government and the relations strained further by the formation of a new command center (Tigris Operation Command) for Iraqi forces to operate in a disputed area over which both Baghdad and the Kurdistan Regional Government (KRG) claim jurisdiction.

On 16 November 2012, a military clash between the Iraqi forces and the Peshmerga resulted in one person killed. CNN reported that 2 people were killed (one of them an Iraqi soldier) and 10 wounded in clashes at the Tuz Khurmato town.

On the night of November 19, it was reported that clashes between security forces of the central Iraqi government and the KRG forces in Tigrit left 12 Iraqi soldiers and one civilian dead, according to Doğan news agency. The clash erupted when Iraqi soldiers attempted to enter northern Iraq; Peshmergas tried to prevent the Iraqi soldiers from entering the area upon Barzani's instructions. There was no confirmation of the event.

On November 25, it was reported that Iraqi Kurdistan sent reinforcements to a disputed area, where its troops are "involved in a standoff with the Iraqi army", despite calls on both sides for dialogue to calm the situation.

On December 11, Iraqi Kurdistan President Massoud Barzani, dressed in a military uniform, visited Kurdish-controlled areas of Kirkuk, a city long seen as a flashpoint for Arab-Kurdish tensions after the US military withdrawal in December 2011. Following Massoud Barzani's visit of Kurdish troops stationed in the disputed area near Kirkuk, Iraqi Prime Minister Maliki's party – The State of Law – issued a statement that "the visit of the President of Kurdistan Region Massoud Barzani and his son wearing a military helmet to inspect the battlefronts in Kirkuk province is a 'declaration of war' on all Iraqis not only Maliki, and even on President Jalal Talabani".

2014 regional conflict in Iraq

In 2014, Iraqi army units fled large parts of northern Iraq in the face of attacks by the Islamic State in Iraq and the Levant. Peshmerga forces took control of Kirkuk and other Kurdish-populated areas outside the official territory of the KRG. Officials in Baghdad were angered by the sale of tankers worth of oil transported through the Kurdish pipeline.

2017 Iraqi Kurdistan independence referendum and ensuing clashes

The former President of the Iraqi Kurdistan Region, Masoud Barzani, facilitated the Iraqi Kurdistan independence referendum in September 2017.

After the Kurdish authorities held an independence referendum on 15 October 2017, the Prime Minister of Iraq Haider al-Abadi to demand that the referendum result be cancelled, and called on the KRG to initiate dialogue "in the framework of the constitution".

In October, Iraq began to move its forces into areas seized by the KRG after the entry of ISIL, and all the disputed areas outside the Kurdish Region, including Kirkuk, after intense preparation between Iraq, Iran, and Turkey. The  Iraqi army conquered the area which is now called a disputed territory.

Casualties
[a]. Iraqi–Kurdish conflict (combined casualty figure 163,800–345,100):
Mahmud Barzanji revolts (1919–1924) – unknown
Ahmed Barzani revolt (1931–1932) – hundreds killed
1943 Barzani revolt (1943–1945) – hundreds killed
First Iraqi–Kurdish War (1961–1970) – 12,000–105,000 killed.
Second Iraqi–Kurdish War (1974–1975) – 9,000 killed.
PUK insurgency (1976–1978) – 800 killed.
 1980 Persecution of Feyli Kurds under Saddam Hussein - 25,000
Iraqi Kurdish uprising (1982–1988) – 50,000–198,000 killed.
1991 Uprising in As Sulaymaniyah – 700–2,000 killed.
Iraqi Kurdish Civil War (1994–1997) – 3,000–5,000 killed
2003 invasion of Iraq (Operation Viking Hammer) – 300 Islamists killed, at least 24 Peshmerga killed; unknown number of Iraqi agents "eliminated".

See also
 Kurdish–Turkish conflict
 Kurdish separatism in Iran
 Rojava conflict

References

Further reading
 Iraqi Insurgent Groups

 
Military history of Kurdistan Region (Iraq)
Military history of Iraq
Kurdish separatism in Iraq
Kurdistan independence movement
20th century in Iraq
Rebellions in Iraq
History of Kurdistan
Wars involving Iraq
History of the Kurdish people
Separatism in Iraq
Wars involving Kurdistan Region (Iraq)
Kurdish rebellions
Civil wars in Iraq